Ben Teekloh (born 6 December 1983) is a Liberian former footballer who played as a defensive midfielder. He last played for FC Astra II Giurgiu in Romania.

Career 
Ben Teekloh previously played for International Allies in Ghana where he started his professional career.

International 
Teekloh was a member of the Liberia national football team and gained 23 caps, including the 2002 African Nations Cup and the 2008 African Nations Cup qualifiers. He earned his first cap in 2001 against Ivory Coast.

On Thursday 16 August 2007, Teekloh was hospitalised after being seriously burnt in an explosion at his apartment. He missed the first half of the season and was reported to have had a miraculous escape.

References

External links
 
 
 

1983 births
Living people
Sportspeople from Monrovia
Liberian footballers
Liberia international footballers
Association football defenders
Association football midfielders
Ghana Premier League players
International Allies F.C. players
Ashanti Gold SC players
Elite One players
Tonnerre Yaoundé players
Oman Professional League players
Al-Nasr SC (Salalah) players
Moldovan Super Liga players
FC Nistru Otaci players
Liga I players
Liga II players
FCV Farul Constanța players
FC Astra Giurgiu players
Liberian expatriate footballers
Liberian expatriate sportspeople in Ghana
Expatriate footballers in Ghana
Liberian expatriate sportspeople in Cameroon
Expatriate footballers in Cameroon
Liberian expatriate sportspeople in Oman
Expatriate footballers in Oman
Liberian expatriate sportspeople in Moldova
Expatriate footballers in Moldova
Liberian expatriate sportspeople in Romania
Expatriate footballers in Romania